Lampung, officially the Province of Lampung, is a province of Indonesia. It is located on the southern tip of the island of Sumatra. It has a short border with the province of Bengkulu to the northwest, and a longer border with the province of South Sumatra to the north. It is the original home of the Lampung people, who speak their own language, and possess their own written script. Its capital is Bandar Lampung.

The province covers a land area of 35,376 sq.km and had a population of 7,608,405 at the 2010 census, 9,007,848 at the 2020 census, and 9,081,792 according to the official estimates for mid 2021, with three-quarters of that being descendants of Javanese, Madurese, and Balinese migrants. These migrants came from more densely populated islands, in search of available land, as well as being part of the national government's Indonesian transmigration program, of which Lampung was one of the earliest and most significant transmigration destinations.

On 10 May 2005, a 6.4 magnitude earthquake struck the province. In 1883, the volcano of Krakatoa, located on an island in the Sunda Strait, suffered one of the most violent volcanic eruptions in recorded history, with disastrous consequences for the area and elsewhere, including estimates of human fatalities in the tens of thousands, and worldwide temperature and other weather effects for years.

History

In the 7th century, word spread throughout China of a region located in the far south (Namphang) known as "Tolang Pohwang", it is referred to Tulang Bawang Regency or regions alongside the Tulang Bawang River. Lampung was part of the Srivijaya empire, with its regional capital in Jambi, which controlled most of Southeast Asia until the 11th century era. The Srivijayans came to Lampung in search of gold and amber, two of the province's natural resources.

This history is substantiated by, unearthed relics and the discovery of the Palas Pasemah inscriptions and the Batu Bedil inscriptions in the Tenggamus region that trace back to Srivijayan times. Other, smaller kingdoms like Tulang Bawang. And Sekala Brak kingdoms maritime existed during the 7th to 8th centuries CE.

The entry of the Banten Sultanate in Lampung in the 16th century marked the beginning of the spread of Islam in the region. Lampung is known for pepper which at that time was in high demand. At that time, the Dutch began pressing for control of the region. In the 1930s Lampung still accounted for 30% of the world's pepper production.

The control of pepper production exercised by the Banten Sultanate made Lampung one of the most prosperous harbors in the archipelago. Similarly, pepper plants also attracted migrants from Europe as employees of trading companies. It was in 1610 that the Dutch East India Company established a trading post in Banten and later in the 17th century began the forceful pepper cultivation in Lampung to increase its already existing production. The area was part of the Banten Sultanate until it was annexed by the Dutch in 1752, when it became known as the Residentie Lampoengse Districten. It became part of the Dutch East Indies.

Under Dutch rule, transmigration programs were implemented. This program involved the migration of people from Java to Lampung. It was quite well-received and many residents of Java moved to the transmigration sites located in the eastern region of Lampung. The program was expanded after Indonesian independence in the 1960s. The Javanese brought cultural devices to Lampung, such as the gamelan and wayang. Balinese  also came to Lampung to follow the transmigration program. The presence of migrants from other regions in Lampung has made this region culturally diverse. Ethnic diversity has become a tourist attraction in itself, with the added potential of nature and cultural tourism. Numerous art studios in the area act as a preserver of indigenous art and culture.

Geography

There are islands within Lampung Province, such: as Daro, Legundi, Tegal, Sebuku, Ketagian, Sebesi, Poahawang, Krakatoa, Putus, and Tabuan. These islands are located mostly in the Bay of Lampung. Pisang Island lies at the entrance to the Regency of West Lampung.

Lampung's natural terrain varies depending on the region. Along the coast in the west and the south is an area of rolling hills connected to the Bukit Barisan mountain range, running throughout Sumatra from north to south. In the center of the province is mostly lowland. Close to the coast in the east, along with the shores of the Java Sea, further north, is the great waters.

The mountains situated in Lampung by height include:
 Mount Pesagi in Liwa, West Lampung
 Mount Seminung in Sukau, West Lampung
 Mount Tebak in Sumberjaya, West Lampung
 Mount Rindingan on the island stage, Tanggamus
 Mount Pesawaran in Kedondong, Pesawaran
 Mount Betung in Teluk Betung, Bandar Lampung
 Mount Rajabasa at the Trump, South Lampung
 Mount Tanggamus in Kotaagung, Tanggamus
 Mount Krakatau in the Sunda Strait, South Lampung
 Mount Sekincau Liwa, West Lampung
 Mount Ratai in Padang Cermin, Pesawaran

The rivers that flow in Lampung by length and catchment area (CA) are:

 Way Sekampung, length , CA 
 Way Seputih, length , CA 
 Way Jepara, CA 
 Way Tulangbawang, length , CA 
 Way Mesuji, length , CA 
 Way Sekampung, flowing in the district Tanggamus, Pringsewu, Pesawaran and South Lampung. There is only one long river   to CA  is in the Trump Way Ketibung.
 Way Pengubuan, length , CA 
 Way Raman, length , CA 
 Way Kanan, length , CA 
 Way Rarem, length , CA 

Forests in the lowlands have been exhausted after being appropriated for agricultural development, which is needed for the migrants constantly entering this area. Timber forest products are exported abroad. Some forests remain in the area of Bukit Barisan Selatan.

Cities and towns in the province of Lampung with a height of 50 meters above sea level are: Tandjungkarang, Kedaton, Metro, Gisting, State Sakti, Pringsewu, Pekalongan, Batang, Punggur, Padang Queen, Wonosobo, Kedondong, Sidomulyo, Kasui, Sri Menanti and Liwa.

Administrative divisions
Lampung Province was subdivided as at 2010 into twelve regencies (kabupaten) and two autonomous cities (kota), but a thirteenth regency – Pesisir Barat Regency – was formed on 25 October 2012 from the west coast part of the West Lampung Regency. These are all listed below with their areas and their populations at the 2010 and 2020 censuses, and at the mid 2021 official estimates.

Agriculture

Major crops in the region include robusta coffee beans, cocoa beans, coconuts and cloves. This has resulted in a thriving agricultural sector with companies like Nestlé procuring coffee beans from the region. This agriculture has included illegal growing in Bukit Barisan Selatan National Park. In addition, nata de coco is also manufactured in the region by domestic companies like Wong Coco.

Textiles

Until the 1920s, Lampung had a rich and varied weaving tradition. Lampung weaving used a supplementary weft technique which enabled colored silk or cotton threads to be superimposed on a plainer cotton background. The most prominent Lampung textile was the Palepai, ownership of which was restricted to the Lampung aristocracy of the Kalianda Bay area. 
  
There were two types of smaller clothes, known as tatibin and tampan, which could be owned and used by all levels of Lampungese society. Weaving technologies were spread throughout Lampung. High-quality weavings were produced by the Paminggir, Krui, Abung and Pesisir peoples. Production was particularly prolific among the people of the Kalianda Bay area in the south and the Krui aristocracy in the north.

Lampung textiles, Palepai, tatebin and tampan were called 'ship cloths' because ships are a common motif. The ship motif represents the transition from one realm of life to the next, for instance from boyhood to manhood or from being single to married, and also represents the final transition to the afterlife.

Traditionally, Lampung textiles were used as part of religious ceremonies such as weddings and circumcisions. For instance, Palepai cloths were used as long ceremonial wall-hangings behind the bridal party in aristocratic marriages. The smaller, more humble tampan cloth was exchanged between families at the time of weddings.

Production of fine cloth blossomed in the late nineteenth century as Lampung grew rich on pepper production, but the devastating eruption of Krakatoa in 1883 destroyed many weaving villages in the Kalianda area. By the 1920s the increasing importance of Islam and the collapse of the pepper trade brought production to a halt. Today Lampung textiles are highly prized by collectors.

Tourism
Although tourism is not Lampung Province's main source of income, the administration has attempted to boost tourism through many ways, mainly from beaches, such as Flamboyant Tanjung Setia. This attraction seeks to draw tourists to Tanjung Setia Beach, which has a natural panoramic view and a spot for surfing. There is also Pahawang Island and Sari Ringgung beach, which is also a popular tourist destination in Lampung. Lampung also has a national park, the Way Kambas National Park, which attracts many domestic and international tourists. In 2010, four-hundred thousand tourists visited Lampung Province, including ten thousand foreign tourists mainly from Australia and New Zealand.

Way Kambas National Park is a national park and elephant sanctuary in the district of Labuhan Ratu, East Lampung. In addition to Way Kambas, another elephant school (Elephant Training Centre) can also be found in Minas, Riau. The number of Sumatran elephants (Elephas maximus sumatranus) living in the region has decreased. Way Kambas National Park was established in 1985 as the first elephant school in Indonesia and is expected to become a center for elephant conservation in taming, training, breeding and conservation. Until now, this PKG has trained about three hundred elephants that have been deployed to other parts of the country.

In recent years, the province has become largely popular for snorkeling and diving. Many domestic tourists, as well as international ones from various diving communities, visit the spots the province offers, such as: Pantai Ringgung, Pulau Tegal, Pulau Pahawang, Pulau Kelagian, Pulau Balak, Pulau Mahitam, and Tanjung Putus.

Demographics

Lampung's three major ethnic groups are the Javanese, Lampungese and Sundanese. The Lampungese are the native ethnic group of the province. Languages used in the province include Indonesian (official), Javanese, Sundanese, Balinese, Minangkabau and Lampung.

Religion

Transport

Land
In the province of Lampung, the Bakauheni-Terbanggi Besar Toll Road spans from Bakauheni in South Lampung to Terbanggi Besar in Central Lampung along  was completed in March 2019. The toll road has been under construction since April 2015. As for the cost of development, is predicted to reach Rp 53 trillion, including land acquisition and construction of approximately Rp 30 trillion. North of Terbanggi Besar to Kayu Agung (South-Sumatra), another toll road is under construction as part of the Trans-Sumatra toll road. This part will be finished in 2019.
Lampung has a bus terminal at Terminal Rajabasa which is one of the biggest and busiest in Sumatra and Lampung, as well as the Talbot terminal in Bandar Lampung. Rajabasa airport's terminal at close range, intermediate, and far (AKAP) which has bus routes to cities in Sumatra and Java.

In addition to these two terminals, there are bus terminals located throughout the capital district in Lampung.

Sea
In the province, there are several ports. The Port of Panjang is an import-export harbor and Port Srengsem which serves the traffic coal distribution from South Sumatra to Java. Located at the southern end of the Trans-Sumatran Highway, the Bakauheni port connects Sumatra to the Port of Merak in Java via sea transportation.

Air
Radin Inten II International Airport is the only airport in the province. It serves flights to Banten, Jakarta, Majalengka, Medan, Bandung, Palembang, Semarang, Surabaya, Surakarta, Yogyakarta and more.

Rail
Lampung Province has a railway line between Bandar Lampung - Palembang, which is part of a railway network in South Sumatra operated by Kereta Api Indonesia Divre IV Tanjung Karang, located in Bandar Lampung. Bandar Lampung - Palembang railway line holds forty stations along  stretches between  station in Bandar Lampung to  station in Palembang.

Sports

The 15,000-capacity Pahoman Stadium is the main stadium in Lampung. The association football stadium opened in 1977.

See also

 List of people from Lampung

References

Further reading
Elmhirst, R. (2001). Resource Struggles and the Politics of Place in North Lampung, Indonesia. Singapore Journal of Tropical Geography. 22(3):284–307.
Pain, Marc (ed). (1989). Transmigration and spontaneous migrations in Indonesia: Propinsi Lampung. Bondy, France: ORSTOM.
Totton, Mary-Louise (2009) Wearing Wealth and Styling Identity: Tapis from Lampung, South Sumatra, Indonesia. Hood Museum of Art, Dartmouth College.

External links
Early Indonesian textiles from three island cultures: Sumba, Toraja, Lampung, an exhibition catalog from The Metropolitan Museum of Art Libraries (fully available online as PDF), which contains material on Lampung

 
Provinces of Indonesia